"Mighty 'O'" (also written "Mighty "O"", and without apostrophes around the O, as "Mighty O") is the first single from OutKast's sixth studio album, Idlewild, released on June 6, 2006. The single was only released in the United States, and is one of only three songs from the album in which both members of OutKast appear together. The other two are "Hollywood Divorce" and "PJ & Rooster". The single peaked at number 77 on the Billboard Hot 100 chart. The song contains a prominent sample of Cab Calloway's "Minnie the Moocher", written by Calloway, Clarence Gaskill and Irving Mills.

Track listings
UK CD single
 "Mighty 'O'" (clean version) – 4:16
 "Mighty 'O'" (main version) – 4:16
 "Mighty 'O'" (instrumental) – 4:16

12" vinyl single
 "Mighty 'O'" (main version) – 4:16
 "Mighty 'O'" (main instrumental) – 4:16
 "Mighty 'O'" (clean version) – 4:16
 "Mighty 'O'" (clean instrumental) – 4:16

Charts
"Mighty O" debuted and peaked at number 77 on the Billboard Hot 100 the week of June 24, 2006. It dropped to number 89 the week after and left the chart completely.

References

2006 singles
Outkast songs
LaFace Records singles
Songs written by André 3000
Songs written by Big Boi
Songs with lyrics by Irving Mills
2006 songs
Sony BMG singles